The 1998 Honda Grand Prix of Monterey Featuring The Texaco-Havoline 300 was the sixteenth round of the 1998 CART FedEx Champ Car World Series season, held on September 13, 1998, at the Mazda Raceway Laguna Seca in Monterey, California. Bryan Herta led the race from start to finish with the exception of pit stops, and held off Alex Zanardi at the end to take his first ever CART win.

Classification

Race

Caution flags

Lap Leaders

Point standings after race

References 

Honda Grand Prix of Monterey